Obeidia lucifera is a moth of the family Geometridae first described by Charles Swinhoe in 1893. It is found in Taiwan, India, China and Nepal.

Subspecies
Obeidia lucifera lucifera
Obeidia lucifera conspurcata Leech, 1897
Obeidia lucifera decipiens Thierry-Mieg, 1899
Obeidia lucifera extranigricans Wehrli, 1933 (Taiwan)
Obeidia lucifera semifumosa Prout, 1925

References

Moths described in 1893
Ennominae